Ray Boughen (May 25, 1937 – December 24, 2022) was a Canadian politician who was mayor of Moose Jaw, Saskatchewan, and a Member of Parliament.

Prior to politics, Boughen worked in education as a teacher and principal. From 1994 to 2000, he was mayor of Moose Jaw.

Boughen was elected to represent the electoral district of Palliser in the 2008 Canadian federal election. He was a member of the Conservative Party and served in parliament until his retirement at the 2015 election.

Boughen died on December 24, 2022, at the age of 85.

References

External links
Ray Boughen

Canada Votes - Palliser
Commission on Financing Kindergarten to Grade 12 Education

1937 births
2022 deaths
Members of the House of Commons of Canada from Saskatchewan
Members of the United Church of Canada
Conservative Party of Canada MPs
Mayors of Moose Jaw
Western Oregon University alumni
21st-century Canadian politicians